Eduard Latypov (born 21 March 1994) is a Russian biathlete. He has competed in the Biathlon World Cup since 2018, and represented Russia at the Biathlon World Championships 2020 and Biathlon World Championships 2021.

Biathlon results
All results are sourced from the International Biathlon Union.

Olympic Games
3 medals (3 bronze)

World Championships
1 medal (1 bronze)

References

External links

1994 births
Living people
Sportspeople from Grodno
Russian male biathletes
Universiade medalists in biathlon
Universiade gold medalists for Russia
Universiade silver medalists for Russia
Universiade bronze medalists for Russia
Competitors at the 2019 Winter Universiade
Biathlon World Championships medalists
Biathletes at the 2022 Winter Olympics
Olympic biathletes of Russia
Medalists at the 2022 Winter Olympics
Olympic medalists in biathlon
Olympic bronze medalists for the Russian Olympic Committee athletes
20th-century Russian people
21st-century Russian people